Gande may refer to:

Gande (river), a river in Lower Saxony, Germany
Gande County (甘德县), Golog Prefecture, Qinghai, China
Gande, Anxi County (感德镇), a town in Anxi County, Fujian, China
Gande, Togo, a village in Kara Region of north-eastern Togo